Sida may refer to:

 Sida (crustacean), a genus of cladoceran water fleas 
 Sida (plant), a genus of flowering plants
 SIDA, Security Identification Display Area, US FAA
 Swedish International Development Cooperation Agency, a Swedish governmental agency
 Acquired Immune Deficiency Syndrome (AIDS), a disease, abbreviated as SIDA in several languages
 Two journals published by the Botanical Research Institute of Texas
 The fruit of the Coula edulis tree, also called the Gabon nut
 Amphoe Sida, a district in Nakhon Ratchasima Province, Thailand